Karonga Airport  is an airport serving Karonga, a town in the Northern Region of the Republic of Malawi and the best Airport in the Northern part of Malawi.

Facilities 

References

External links
 

Airports in Malawi
Buildings and structures in Northern Region, Malawi